The Chodaczków Wielki massacre occurred on 16 April 1944 when 862 Poles were killed by the 14th Waffen Grenadier Division of the SS (1st Galician) in the village of Chodaczków Wielki in German occupied Poland (now Velykyi Khodachkiv, Ternopil Oblast, Ukraine.)

The massacre started when the perpetrators, a division composed of ethnic Ukrainian volunteers, arrived to the town of 2,800 people in order to turn the settlement into a base to supply reinforcements for the then-ongoing siege of Ternopil. Once they entered, they began setting the houses of ethnic Poles on fire. Soldiers tossed grenades into burning houses and shot anyone who tried to flee. The bodies of the victims were buried in a mass grave outside the local church. An estimated 862 Poles were killed (including children and elderly), making it one of the largest massacres of Poles.

See also 

 Huta Pieniacka massacre

References 

Anti-Polish sentiment in Europe
World War II massacres
Massacres in Ukraine
Ethnic cleansing in Europe
Massacres in 1944
1944 murders in Europe
1944 in Ukraine
April 1944 events
Arson in Europe
Grenade attacks